Manthoppu Kiliye is 1979 Indian Tamil-language film, directed by M. A. Kaja. It stars Sudhakar and Deepa, with Major Sundarrajan, Ganthimathi and Suruli Rajan in supporting roles. The film was released in 20 October 1979. Suruli Rajan played a niggard in the film which got very popular among the people. The film did well at the box office for his comedy.

Plot                
Raghupathy is an honest manager of a cement company, Arun is a worker of this company Mohan, the dishonest owner of another cement company tries to persuade Raghupathy to buy his products and promises commission of 1 for each cement bag but he fails due to Raghupathy's honest nature. Late Mohan persuades Arun who accepts this plan due to his greed for money but the plan fails when Raghupathy discovers it, to take revenge he befriends Madan, who wants to marry Arun's sister Saratha who refuses this proposal due to bad nature of Madan and is wed  to Shiva, brother of Raghupathy this event is opposed by Arun, however  he is unsuccessful in cancelling  Saratha's marriage, later Arun succeeds in dismissing Raghupathy from his job by falsely  accusing him of stealing the company's money. The three families live separately.

Arun and Jayanthi's family is destroyed by Arun's greed, as he offers his wife to Madan for sex due to his greed for money, but his wife refuses to satisfy sexual favours of Madan. The second family prospers due to wise use of money. Due to which Raghupathy and Saratha are hired. Sulochana and Kasi's family is destroyed due to the misery nature of Kasi Nathan, predominantly due to the death of Kasi Nathan's son.

Cast 
Sudhakar as Siva
Deepa as Saratha
Suruli Rajan as ''Kanjan'' Kasinathan
Major Sundarrajan as Raghupathy
Ganthimathi as Sulochana
Omakuchi Narasimhan as Homeopathy doctor
Shanthi Williams as Lakshmi
Praveena Bhagyaraj as Jayanthi
T. K. S. Natarajan as Iyer
S. N. Parvathy

Soundtrack 
Lyrics were written By M. A. Kaja and Poonkuyilan. The music was composed by Shankar–Ganesh.

References

External links 
 

1970s Tamil-language films
1979 films
Films scored by Shankar–Ganesh